Wahlbach may refer to:

 Wahlbach, Haut-Rhin, a commune in north-eastern France
 Wahlbach, Rhineland-Palatinate, a municipality in Germany
 Wahlbach (Burbach), a district of Burbach in North Rhine-Westphalia, Germany

See also
Walbach (disambiguation)
Wallbach (disambiguation)